A constitutional referendum was held in Rwanda on 17 December 1978. It followed the 1973 coup d'état by Juvénal Habyarimana and the dissolution of the former sole legal party, MDR-Parmehutu. The new constitution created a presidential republic with no term limits for the President, and made the National Revolutionary Movement for Development the sole legal party. The new constitution replaced the National Assembly, which had been disbanded in 1973, with a new legislative body, the National Development Council. 

The constitution was approved by 89% of voters.

Results

References

Constitutional
Rwanda
Referendums in Rwanda
Constitutional referendums
Election and referendum articles with incomplete results